Lothar Heinz Wieler (born 8 February 1961) is a German veterinarian and microbiologist who has been serving as president of the Robert Koch Institute (RKI) since 2015. In this capacity, he advises the German Federal and State Governments on topics of public health, especially infection hazards, and on the containment of the COVID-19 pandemic.

Early life and education
Wieler was born in Königswinter, Germany. He studied veterinary medicine at Free University of Berlin and Ludwig Maximilian University of Munich from 1980 to 1985.

Career
From 1998 until 2015, Wieler worked as professor and director of the Institute of Microbiology and Epizootics at the Free University of Berlin. During that time, he spent a sabbatical at the Wellcome Sanger Institute in Hinxton under the supervision of Gordon Dougan.

Early in the COVID-19 pandemic in Germany, Wieler launched Europe’s first large-scale SARS-CoV-2 antibody testing in an effort to help researchers assess infection rates and monitor the spread of the virus more effectively; the study was carried out jointly by the Robert Koch Institute, Charité and the Helmholtz Centre for Infection Research.

In addition to his role at RKI, Wieler has been a member of the World Health Organization's Strategic and Technical Advisory Group for Infectious Hazards (STAG-IH) since 2018. In 2020, he chaired the WHO's Committee for the Review of the International Health Regulations. Also in 2020, he was appointed to the Global Leaders Group on Antimicrobial Resistance, co-chaired by Sheikh Hasina and Mia Mottley.

Other activities 
 World Health Organization (WHO), Member of the European Advisory Committee on Health Research (since 2018)
 Global Research Collaboration for Infectious Disease Preparedness (GloPID-R), Member of the Scientific Advisory Board (since 2016)
 Fraunhofer Institute for Telecommunications, Member of the Board of Trustees
 Robert Koch Foundation, Member of the Scientific Advisory Council

References 

Living people
1961 births
German veterinarians
German microbiologists
People from Königswinter
21st-century German scientists
Free University of Berlin alumni
Ludwig Maximilian University of Munich alumni
Academic staff of the University of Ulm
Academic staff of the University of Giessen
German Catholics
Scientists from Berlin
COVID-19 pandemic in Germany
Members of the German Academy of Sciences Leopoldina
Robert Koch Institute people